Barry Coward (22 February 1941 – 17 March 2011) was a professor of history at Birkbeck College, University of London, and an expert on the Stuart age.

Selected publications
The Stuart Age. 1980.
Social Change and Continuity in Early Modern England, 1550-1750. Longman, 1988. (Seminar Studies in History) 
Cromwellian Protectorate. 2002.

References 

1941 births
2011 deaths
Academics of Birkbeck, University of London
People from Rochdale
Alumni of Sheffield Hallam University